William Otterwell Ignatius Brady (February 1, 1899 – October 1, 1961) was an American prelate of the Roman Catholic Church. He served as Bishop of Sioux Falls (1939–1956) and Archbishop of Saint Paul (1956–1961).

Biography
William Brady was born in Fall River, Massachusetts, to John J. and Gladys (née Davol) Brady. He had an older brother, Louis, and a younger sister, Leonora. He attended B.M.C. Durfee High School, where he was editor of the yearbook during his senior year. From 1916 to 1918, he attended St. Charles College in Catonsville, Maryland. He continued his studies at St. Mary's Seminary in Baltimore (1918–1920) and at the Theological College of The Catholic University of America in Washington, D.C. (1920–1923). While at the Sulpician Seminary, Brady accepted an offer from Archbishop Austin Dowling to join the Roman Catholic Archdiocese of Saint Paul in Minnesota. He was ordained to the priesthood on December 21, 1923 in Fall River, Massachusetts.

Brady earned a Bachelor of Sacred Theology degree from the Catholic University of America in 1924. In August of that year, he was sent to further his studies in Rome at the Pontifical University of St. Thomas Aquinas, better known as the Angelicum. He later earned his Doctor of Sacred Theology summa cum laude in 1926. Upon his return to Minnesota in 1926, he became a professor of moral and pastoral theology at Saint Paul Seminary.

Brady became rector of the Saint Paul Seminary in 1933 and remained in that position until 1939.

On June 10, 1939, Pope Pius XII appointed Brady bishop of the Roman Catholic Diocese of Sioux Falls in Sioux Falls, South Dakota and he was ordained a bishop on August 24, 1939 by Archbishop John Gregory Murray at the Cathedral of St. Paul in St. Paul, Minnesota. On June 16, 1956, Pope Pius XII appointed Bishop Brady Coadjutor Archbishop of St. Paul, Minnesota. Brady succeeded John Gregory Murray as Archbishop of St. Paul upon Murray's death on October 11, 1956 and served in the office until his own death.

Death
Brady was appointed as a consulter to the Pontifical Commission of Bishops and the Government of Dioceses for the Second Vatican Council. A little more than one year before the first session of Vatican II, Brady, who seemed to be in good health, left Minnesota to travel to the Vatican to attend a preparatory meeting of the Pontifical Commission to which he had been appointed. His journey began September 21, 1961, and included stops in both Chicago and Paris. On a flight from Paris to Rome on September 23 he was stricken with coronary thrombosis. He did not lose consciousness, and even walked into Salvator Mundi Hospital in Rome, where he had been driven. Several times he rallied and spoke of wanting to get back to work, but over eight days he had four heart attacks, the last of which brought about his death on October 1, 1961.

After a first funeral Mass at the Church of Santa Susanna in Rome, Brady’s body was flown back to Minnesota on October 4 and was brought to the Cathedral of St. Paul in St. Paul on October 7. A vigil took place over two days as mourners waited in lines that stretched outside the cathedral and down the front steps. The main funeral Mass took place on October 9 at the Cathedral of St. Paul. The principal celebrant was Archbishop Leo Binz of Dubuque, who two months later was named Brady’s successor as Archbishop of St. Paul.

Legacy
Brady was commemorated in the naming of Archbishop Brady High School in West Saint Paul, Minnesota, which has since closed. Following the thread of other archbishops in the Archdiocese, Brady's namesake was given to two buildings at the University of St. Thomas (Minnesota). The first of these buildings is Brady Hall, which serves as one of the university's male residence halls. The second is Brady Educational Center, which houses the practice spaces for the musical ensembles of St. Thomas along with classroom space for the Saint Paul Seminary School of Divinity. Within the Brady Educational Center is an auditorium commonly used for both musical and dancing performances.
Efforts to name a new facility after Brady have fallen short, as his relationship with the priests in the Diocese were not on good terms while he served as Archbishop.

Bishop Brady was instrumental in building the first two Catholic nursing homes in the State of South Dakota.  The facility in Milbank, SD which has been operated under the care of the Daughters of St. Mary of Providence bears his name and from its inception has been known as St. William's (Care Center).

References

1899 births
1961 deaths
St. Charles College alumni
St. Mary's Seminary and University alumni
Catholic University of America alumni
Pontifical University of Saint Thomas Aquinas alumni
People from Fall River, Massachusetts
20th-century Roman Catholic archbishops in the United States
Roman Catholic archbishops of Saint Paul
Roman Catholic bishops of Sioux Falls
Catholics from Massachusetts
B.M.C. Durfee High School alumni